Alejandro Falla was the defending champion, but decided to compete in the 2015 Aircel Chennai Open instead.

Steve Darcis won the title, defeating Adrián Menéndez-Maceiras 6–3, 6–2 in the final.

Seeds

Draw

Finals

Top half

Bottom half

References
 Main Draw
 Qualifying Draw

BNP Paribas de Nouvelle-Caledonie - Singles
Internationaux de Nouvelle-Calédonie